Başur Höyük in Turkey's south-eastern Siirt province is the location of a 5,000-year-old Bronze Age burial site. The 820-foot by 492-foot burial mound in a valley of the upper Tigris River was excavated in the years up to 2018, by Brenna Hassett of the Natural History Museum in London, and Haluk Sağlamtimur of Ege University in Turkey. The tomb contained the remains of two 12-year-old children, and the remains of an adult which may have been reburied. The remains of eight other people aged 11 to 20 were found buried outside the tomb. These remains were carbon-dated to between 3100 and 2800 BCE, and at least some of the people are believed to have been sacrificed.

Grave goods
Along with the children's bodies were buried hundreds of bronze spearheads, while the bodies outside the tomb were buried with textiles, beads, and ceramics, and at least some of the people are believed to have been sacrificed.

Overall, the graves revealed a unique treasure made of painted and unpainted pottery, bronze spearhead, various ritual artifacts, seals with geometric motifs and about 300 well-preserved amorphous bronze artifacts. The majority of pots featured bitumen residues. Tens of thousands of beads made of mountain crystal and other types of stones were also recovered from the burials.

The excavation also found 49 small pieces of stone elaborately sculpted in different shapes and painted in green, red, blue, black and white. "Some depict pigs, dogs and pyramids, others feature round and bullet shapes. We also found dice as well as three circular tokens made of white shell and topped with a black round stone," stated Haluk Sağlamtimur of Ege University. The stone pieces are therefore believed to be a set of gaming pieces, thereby confirming that board games probably originated in the Fertile Crescent regions and Egypt more than 5,000 years ago. The stones were accompanied by badly preserved wooden pieces. Similar pieces were apparently found settlement mounds in Tell Brak in north-eastern Syria, and Jemdet Nasr in Iraq, but those were believed to be counting stones.

Marcella Frangipane, a professor of prehistoric archaeology at Rome's La Sapienza, has stated that: "The findings at Başur Höyük add to our knowledge as they reveal a coexistence of traditions and a continuity of relationships between the settlements in the northern mountains and the Mesopotamia sites."

Human sacrifice
Archaeologists Hassett and Sağlamtimur speculate that the eight people buried outside the tomb may have been sacrificed, possibly as “retainers” to serve the others in the afterlife. Brenna has stated that: 'It is unlikely that these children and young people were killed in a massacre or conflict. The careful positioning of the bodies and the evidence of violent death suggest that these burials fit the same pattern of human sacrifice seen at other sites in the region. The burial has parallels with the elaborate burials from the Royal Cemetery of Ur."

The site at Başur Höyük is believed to be 500 years older than the Royal Cemetery of Ur, the elaborate tombs where Mesopotamian rulers were laid to rest. In the Royal Cemetery of Ur, hundreds of burials were identified as sacrifices.

The burials show evidence of large political and social upheavals around this time, when early states were forming in southwest Asia. Brenna therefore thinks that sacrifices like this one were a way of controlling a city or state's population.

Further excavations have revealed a series of other burials at the site, including a mass death pit containing at least fifty individuals who were buried simultaneously.

See also
Batman Museum

References

Bronze Age sites
Archaeological sites in Turkey